Abi (born Abigail Dawn Ann Hoffman; June 26, 1997) is a singer/songwriter signed to One Country Records.

Career
Originally from Midland, TX, Abi moved to Nashville to pursue a Business Entrepreneurship degree at Belmont University and a career in music. Abi released the Day Dreaming EP in 2013 then with the stage name of "Abi Ann", which included four versions of the song. Until her full EP 17 was released in 2015, she released singles like "Too Far Gone," "One Last Tear" and "Just To Say We Tried" (all in 2014), "Silence" and the holiday song, "Santa, Can You Hear Me" (both in 2012). 17 includes her songs, "Future Ex-Boyfriend," "Cage Without A Key," "Truck Candy," "Your Side of Town" and "It's The Bones". Since she has released two other singles "Put A Bow On It" (2016) and her most recent single "Matches" (2017).

In 2014, Abi toured with Jesse McCartney along the West Coast including the House of Blues in Los Angeles, California.
She went on her first national tour, the Piece by Piece Tour with Kelly Clarkson, Eric Hutchison and Pentatonix in 2015. The tour hit 36 cities in the US and Canada. And in the fall of 2016, she went on tour with Pentatonix and Us The Duo on the Pentatonix World Tour. She has also toured with Eli Young Band, Frankie Ballard, performed at Nascar events across the country, and opened for Sam Hunt, Phil Vassar, Mo Pitney, and others at the 30th Annual Country Fest in Cadott, WI.

The Independent Music Network named Abi "America's Favorite Teen Country Artist" in 2012. The following year, she headlined the Commemorative Air Force (CAF) Airshow in Midland, Texas.

Abi received 14 nominations and won 5 titles at the 2013 Indie Music Channel Awards.

In 2017, Abi's single ‘Matches’ quickly caught fire scoring her a spot on CMT’s Artist Discovery Program, earned her 8+ weeks of airplay on CMT music, and generated over 150,000 views on Vevo.

In May 2018, Abi premiered her new single, "A Day Without" with Taste of Country. The catchy yet heartfelt song was co-written by Andrew Dorff, Jimmy Robbins and Lucie Silvas and was immediately named one of Rolling Stones Country's "10 Best Country Songs of the Week." "A Day Without" has generated over 75,000 streams on Apple Music as of August 2018. On July 30, 2018 "A Day Without" debuted at number 59 on the Billboard Country Music Indicator chart. The song was only one of three new songs debuted on the chart that week. The others included Brett Eldredge's "Love Someone" and Blake Shelton's "Turnin' Me On." Since the release, "A Day Without" has been featured in several credited playlists listed below.

Spotify
 "CMT Next Women of Country"
 "CMT Music" 
 "Country 2018 🎸🎶🎤🇺🇸☀️😎"
 "The Sound You Need"
 "Girl Power Run!"
 "Tomorrowland 2018 🔥#1"
 "100 Essentials"
 "Summer Backyard BBQ"
 "The Country Pop Playlist You Need This Summer"
"Summer Country"
"A Very Gab Labor Day"
"Sounds of The Shotgun Seat"
"End of Summer"

Apple Music
 "Shazam Recommends: The Best New Music"
"Cool Country"

TIDAL
 "TIDAL Rising: Country/Folk"

Filmography
According to IMDb,
 Naked Innocence (2010)
 Beyond the Mat (2013)
 Someone I Used to Know (2013)
 Wish Wizard (2014)
 Music
 Hello Herman (2012)
 My Dog's Christmas Miracle (2011)
 Diary of an Ex-Child Start (2010)
 Soundtrack
 Cassidy Way: "The Kind of Trouble I Like" (2016)
 Production
 The Killers in Connecticut: Associate Producer (2012)

Discography
 "Silence" (2012)
 "Santa Can You Hear Me" (2012)
 DayDreaming (2013)
 "One Last Tear "(2014)
 "Too Far Gone" (2014) 
 "Just Say We Tried" (2014) 
 EP: 17'' (Released in 2015) 
 "Future Ex Boyfriend"
 "Cage Without a Key"
 "It's the Bones"
 "Your Side of Town"
 "Truck Candy"
 "Put a Bow on It "(2016)
 "Matches" (2017)
"A Day Without" (2018)

Sources

External links
 

1997 births
Living people
People from Midland, Texas
American women country singers
American country singer-songwriters
American women singer-songwriters
Singer-songwriters from Texas
21st-century American women singers
21st-century American singers
Country musicians from Texas